The 1939 Kentucky gubernatorial election was held on November 7, 1939. Incumbent Democrat Keen Johnson defeated Republican nominee King Swope with 56.51% of the vote.

Primary elections
Primary elections were held on August 5, 1939.

Democratic primary

Candidates
Keen Johnson, incumbent Lieutenant Governor
John Y. Brown Sr., former U.S. Representative
Charles D. Arnett
Ulysses G. Foster

Results

Republican primary

Candidates
King Swope, former U.S. Representative
John Sherman Cooper, former State Representative
L. O. Smith
G. Tom Hawkins

Results

General election

Candidates
Keen Johnson, Democratic
King Swope, Republican

Results

References

1939
Kentucky
Gubernatorial